Les Compagnes de la nuit , is a French drama film from 1953, directed by Ralph Habib, written by Paul Andréota, starring Françoise Arnoul and Louis de Funès.

Cast 
 Françoise Arnoul : Olga Viterbo
 Raymond Pellegrin : Jo Verdier
 Nicole Maurey :  Yvonne Leriche
 Noël Roquevert : the Smiling
 Marthe Mercadier : Ginette Bachelet
 Louis de Funès : a client
 Pierre Cressoy : Paul Gamelan
 Suzy Prim : Pierrette
 Jane Marken : Mrs Anita
 Christian Fourcade : Jackie Viterbo
 André Valmy : the inspector Maréchal
 Pierre Mondy : Sylvestre, campaign of Paul
 Huguette Montréal : Bella

References

External links 
 
 Les Compagnes de la nuit (1953) at the Films de France

1953 films
French drama films
1950s French-language films
French black-and-white films
Films directed by Ralph Habib
1953 drama films
1950s French films